The women's doubles competition of the table tennis event at the 2007 Southeast Asian Games was held from 8 to 9 December at the Klang Plaza in Nakhon Ratchasima, Thailand.

Participating nations
A total of 28 athletes from eight nations competed in women's doubles table tennis at the 2007 Southeast Asian Games:

Schedule
All times are Thailand Time (UTC+07:00).

Results

Final 16

References

External links
 

2007 in table tennis
2007 in women's table tennis
2007 Southeast Asian Games events